Chanchaga is a Local Government Area in Niger State, Nigeria. Its headquarters is in the state capital of Minna which occupies much of the Local Government Area.

It has an area of 72 km and a population of 201,429 at the 2006 census.

The postal code of the area is 920.

History 
There are a lot of institute for learning in chanchaga local government, under chanchaga we also have paikoro local government where we have our international yam market.

References

Local Government Areas in Niger State